The Octagon Barn, Richland Township is an historic building located near Jamaica in Guthrie County, Iowa, United States. Built in 1881, this is the oldest known octagon-shaped barn extant in Iowa. It measures  in diameter. The modified hip roof, heavy timber construction, rectangular plan, and general purpose use marks this as a Coffin type. It was named for Lorenzo S. Coffin who is thought to have built the first round barn in the state. This barn was listed on the National Register of Historic Places in 1986. The metal band Slipknot filmed the music video for Psychosocial here.

References

Infrastructure completed in 1881
Barns on the National Register of Historic Places in Iowa
Octagon barns in the United States
Buildings and structures in Guthrie County, Iowa
National Register of Historic Places in Guthrie County, Iowa